Twin Peaks is a mountain in the northern part of Yosemite National Park, north of Tuolumne Meadows. It is the 15th highest mountain in Yosemite National Park.

On Twin Peaks's particulars

Twin Peaks is near Twin Peaks Pass.

Twin Peaks is at times a somewhat mysterious mountain in Yosemite, on the uppermost reaches of Virginia Canyon. From the east along US 395, Twin Peaks can be difficult to identify.

Twin Peaks has two summits, though they are not twins.

Twin Peaks is also near Whorl Mountain, Black Mountain, Excelsior Mountain, Mount Warren, Virginia Peak, and North Peak. Twin Peaks is west and a bit north of Mono City.

References

Mountains of Yosemite National Park
Mountains of Tuolumne County, California
North American 3000 m summits
Mountains of Northern California
Sierra Nevada (United States)